Taipei Story is a 1985 Taiwanese film directed, scored, and co-written by Edward Yang — his second full-length feature film and third overall. The film stars Yang's fellow filmmaker Hou Hsiao-hsien and singer Tsai Chin, whom Yang subsequently married. It is one of the earliest films of the New Taiwanese Cinema.

In the United States, Janus Films gave a limited release of the film's 4K restoration, done by the World Cinema Project, on March 17, 2017.

Title

The original title,  "green plums and a bamboo horse", refers to Chinese plums and the childhood practice of riding a bamboo stick as a pretend horse. This idiom alludes to an 8th-century poem by Li Bai, and in China it refers to a childhood sweetheart.

Plot
A young woman (Tsai Chin) urgently seeks to navigate the maze of contemporary Taipei, and find a future. She hopes that her boyfriend Lung (Hou Hsiao-hsien) is the key to the future, but Lung is stuck in a past that combines baseball and traditional loyalty that leads him to squander his nest egg bailing her father out of financial trouble.

Characters
Tsai Chin - Chin, an office worker
Hou Hsiao-hsien - Lung, a former baseball player
Wu Nien-jen - Ch'en, a taxi driver and former baseball player
Lin Hsiu-ling - Ling
Ke Su-yun - Gwan
Ko I-chen - Mr. Ke, an architect
Mei Fang - Chin's mother
Wu Ping-nan - Chin's father
Yang Li-yin - Ch'en's wife
Chen Shu-fang - Mrs. Mei
Lai Te-nan - a coach

Themes
According to the Doc Film Society, the film "displays Yang's uncompromising critique of the middle-class with its dissection of its heroine's emotional fragility, vainly disguised behind the sunglasses she sports day and night. As she flees the past, her boyfriend idealistically clings to it, a Confucian rigidity toward which Yang bears still less patience."

References

External links

Taipei Story: Modern Planning an essay by Andrew Chan at the Criterion Collection

Taiwanese drama films
1985 films
1980s Mandarin-language films
Films directed by Edward Yang
Films with screenplays by Chu T’ien-wen
Films set in Taipei